T. Mariappa (1904-1964) was a finance minister of Mysore State, India.

He was also a member of the first Backward Classes Commission, set up in 1953 by the Government of India to investigate and advise on socio-economically deprived communities in

the country.

Early life 
TIGALI MARIAPPA  B.A.,  L.L.B.  (1904–1964)

Freedom Fighter

Name of the Father:- Tigali Mariappa Maistry.

Name of the Mother:- Hombalamma.

Name of Grandfather:- Tigali Mari Gowda.

 Tigali is a small village near Coimbatore.
 Tigali Mari Gowda was a Labour Contractor for Tea Estate in Ooty.
 Tigali Mari Gowda was also a contractor for supply of Kambalies to Tea Estates.
 He migrated to Kallanakere in 19th Century in search of laborers and for supply of Kambalies.
 Father of Tigali Mariappa was known by the name Tigali Mariaya Maistry.
 Tigali Mariya Maistry continued the business of his father Tigali Mari Gowda.
 Tigali Mariya Maistry due to his business association with Britishers took keen interest in the education of his first son Tigali Mariappa.
 Tigali Mariappa also continued the business of his father Tigali Mariya Maistry till 1924.

Education 

 1909–1920: -Primary and Secondary Education in A.V. School, Nagamangala.
 1920–1924:- Maharaja’s College Mysore.
 1924–1928:- Law College Pune

And was a classmate of Shri. S. Nijalingappa Chief Minister of Mysore.

Career 

 1928–1947:- Advocate at Mysore in the office of the Shri. H.C. Dasappa who was a union Railway Minister in the cabinet of Shri. Pandit Jawaharlal  Nehru and Shri. Lal Bahadur Shastri.
 1929–1947:- Member of Representative Assembly Mysore. Member of Legislative Council Mysore. Leader of Constitution Assembly Mysore.
 1947–1950:- Minister for Home, Mysore Railways, Mysore Army in the cabinet of Shri. K.C. Reddy
 1950–1952:- Minister for Home, Transport, Food and civil Supplies.
 1952–1957:- MLA for Mysore City North.
 1953–1955:- Member and author of the report of KAKA KALELKAR Commission for Backward Classes, Govt. of India.
 1956–1957:- Minister for Finance in the New Mysore State (Now Karnataka).
 1957–1962:- MLA for Nagamangala, Mandya District.
 1957–1962:- Minister for Finance and Sericulture-In the cabinet of Shri. S. Nijaligappa/ Shri. B.D. Jatti.

Other Positions Held 

 1940–1947:- President of the Labour union of  K.R. Mills Mysore.
 1952–1955:- President of the Labour union of Post and Telegraph Employees.
 1955–1956:- General secretary, Mysore Pradesh Congress Committee
 1955–1956:- Director H.M.T.
 1962–1964:- Director Hindustan Photo Films/ Indian Telephone Industry.
 1963–1964:- Legal Adviser MICO Bangalore.

Critical Issues and Events 

 1948 :- Dr. K. M. Munshi in his autobiography has admired the handling of Hindu Muslim riots by T. Mariappa as minister for Home.
 1955 :- The British Guiana Government in its official website has recorded the role of T.M. Mariappa as General Secretary, MPCC in organizing the visit of Mr. Cheddi Jagan, the then Chief Minister of British Guiana Government who had come to India to seek the support of Indian people for ending the British rule in Guiana, South America.

Recognition of Role of T. Mariappa in the State of Mysore and Karnataka 

 1995:- University of Mysore awarded Ph.D. to  Mr. Narayanappa Lecture in History on his Thesis
 "Mysore SAMSTHAANADA APRATHISTHITHA NAYAKATVADA ONDU  ADHYAYANA-T. MARIAPPA (1904–1964)”

References

1904 births
1964 deaths
State cabinet ministers of Karnataka
Mysore MLAs 1957–1962
Mysore MLAs 1952–1957
Members of the Mysore Legislature
Indian National Congress politicians from Karnataka